Wallflower were an alternative rock band from London, England. They were active between 1994–1998, and released two EPs and a 10" single.

Influences
Initially heavily influenced by the likes of Faith No More, Tool and Pearl Jam, Wallflower soon acquired a considerably wider range of more progressive and eclectic influences, including Nick Drake, Robert Fripp, Tortoise, Slint and Tom Waits, and also took influence from many aspects of contemporary art and poetry. The band's later work took a somewhat more experimental turn, with many experiments with song structures, alternative instrumentation (including using AM radios, various percussion instruments, steel pans, and more usage of effects processing) and live improvisation.

Members
 Andrew Cannon - vocals, percussion, keyboards
 James Hounsell - guitar
 Russell Wark - bass guitar
 Jon Steele - drums and percussion

The band was originally formed in 1992 under the name Jesus Freaksign. After multiple lineup changes, the band consolidated their lineup and changed their name to Wallflower in 1995.

Live performances
The band became regulars as such London venues as the Hope & Anchor in Islington, The Dublin Castle in Camden, The King's Head in Fulham and The Orange in West Kensington, as well as playing shows further afield, including support slots with Imogen Heap, Breed 77 and The Crazy Gods Of Endless Noise. The band also played at the Marxism '96 event at the University College London ULU. Their live show was notable for the inclusion of much live improvisation, performance art and occasional use of projections.

Recordings
The band recorded the "Spooning Music" demo in 1994 (tracks included "Blackbird", "Cover Girl" and "Grace"), and followed it up with the "Uncovered" EP in 1995 (featuring the tracks "Underlay", "Yield", "She Steers, She Guides Us" and "The Way She Moves"). This EP was widely distributed among London's underground rock scene, and brought the band considerable recognition, including a review in the NME.

"Airmailed" EP
In 1997, the band recorded the "Airmailed" EP - this was released on 10" vinyl through the band's own Room Four Music imprint. The initial pressing of 500 copies sold well, and still command good prices on the used market. The title track was not widely distributed, but included airtime on the  XFM radio station.

Breakup and aftermath
Wallflower played their final show at the King's Head in Fulham in February 1998, due to the departure of founding member James Hounsell. The band did briefly search for a replacement guitarist, but eventually decided to disband, acknowledging that finding another guitarist who would fit with the band's chemistry would be difficult.

Subsequent to the split, Jon Steele went on to play with post-rock group State River Widening, Andrew Cannon supervised music for the feature filmSubsequent to the split, Jon Steele went on to play with post-rock group State River Widening, Andrew Cannon supervised music for the feature film Morvern Callar and Russell Wark was to later play for the alternative rock band 5th Man Down. and Russell Wark was to later play for the alternative rock band 5th Man Down.

References

External links
 Wallflower at MySpace

English rock music groups